Edward Ervin Foster (born June 5, 1954) is a former American football wide receiver who played two seasons with the Houston Oilers of the National Football League. He was drafted by the Houston Oilers in the eighth round of the 1977 NFL Draft. He played college football at the University of Houston and attended Kashmere High School in Houston, Texas.

References

External links
Just Sports Stats
College stats

Living people
1954 births
Players of American football from Houston
American football wide receivers
Houston Cougars football players
Houston Oilers players